Suzanne Mallouk (born September 10, 1960) is a Canadian-born painter, psychiatrist, and psychoanalyst based in New York City. She is best known for being amongst a core of East Village creatives in the 1980s and for her relationship with artist Jean-Michel Basquiat, both of which are chronicled by her friend Jennifer Clement in Widow Basquiat: A Memoir. In 2015, Vogue magazine listed Basquiat and Mallouk among "The 21 Most Stylish Art World Couples of All Time."

Mallouk was involved in the pursuit of justice for the death of Michael Stewart, a victim of police brutality in 1983. In 1985, Mallouk had a one-woman show at the Vox Populi Gallery in the East Village. She also had a brief music career as singer and songwriter performing under the stage name Ruby Desire. From 1990 to 2005, she pursued her education and became a Doctor of Medicine with a specialty in psychiatry.

Life and career 
Mallouk was born in Orangeville, Ontario, Canada on September 10, 1960. Her Palestinian father and her British mother, a naval officer, met and married in Beirut, Lebanon before moving to Canada. As a teenager, she became involved with the 1970s Punk movement and was particularly taken with Iggy Pop and was inspired by the book Rene Ricard: 1979–1980, and for those reasons she chose to move to New York City to become an artist, after attending art school at H.B. Beal in London, Ontario.

Mallouk arrived in Manhattan on Valentine's Day in 1980 and spent the night at the Seville Hotel before relocating to the Martha Washington Hotel. Upon her arrival, Mallouk developed an anonymous telephone relationship with poet Rene Ricard, whose number she found in the phone book. Mallouk worked as a waitress at Max's Kansas City, then a cigarette girl at the Ritz.

While bartending at Night Birds bar in the East Village, she met Jean-Michel Basquiat. In 1981, Basquiat moved into her apartment and she supported him financially while he focused on painting. Basquiat and Mallouk moved into a loft provided by gallerist Annina Nosei in SoHo in 1982. She witnessed his transition from a penniless artist to become a millionaire. Basquiat referred to her as "Venus" in his paintings as seen in A Panel of Experts (1982), which depicts a fight between Mallouk and Madonna, his girlfriend at the time. She is also mentioned as "Venus" in the drawing Cheese Popcorn (1982). Mallouk is depicted in the drawings Self Portrait with Suzanne (1982) and Big Shoes (1983).

Mallouk was dating aspiring artist and model Michael Stewart at the time of his death from police brutality in 1983. Stewart had been detained by the New York City Transit Police for writing graffiti in the subway and was brought to Bellevue Hospital battered. Mallouk went to the hospital with Stewart's family; she took photos of him as he lay in a coma and gave them to the press. Stewart died from his injuries on September 28, 1983, thirteen days after his arrest at the age of 25. Mallouk helped organize the Michael Stewart Justice Committee. "I hired his legal team, raising money from the arts community," she said. "I went to every gallery that was showing graffiti art and asked for donations. I also got a large donation from Keith Haring, who gave the money from a sale of one of his paintings. Madonna did a show at Danceteria and also donated all the proceeds." The officers arrested in connection to Stewart's death were acquitted of all charges in November 1985.

Mallouk worked for designer Maripol at Fiorucci. She posed for the Italian painter Francesco Clemente, and three of the paintings were shown at Galerie Bruno Bischofberger in Zurich for Collaborations: Basquiat, Clemente, Warhol in 1984. She was also photographed by Andy Warhol and these photographs are in the Andy Warhol Museum Archive. From February 9 – March 7, 1985, Mallouk had a solo exhibition at Colin de Land's Vox Populi Gallery on East 6th Street in the East Village. Later that year, she participated in the 92nd Street Y's "Artists' Hospitality Tour," where she discussed the development of her work with tourists in her studio. Her work is now held in private collections internationally and at the Nakamura Keith Haring Collection in Hokuto, Japan.

In the late 1980s, Mallouk performed under the name Ruby Desire at nightclubs such as Area, Madam Rosa's, and Palladium. She was signed to Les Disques Du Crépuscule and released a cover of Donna Summer's "Bad Girls" in 1987. Mallouk co-wrote the song "Like This Like That" by Madagascar, which was released on Capitol Records in 1988. With Capitol records, she toured Europe as the song climbed the British dance charts. After the tour, she decided to leave the music business, to go to school, as she worked as a bartender as the Tunnel nightclub.

The death of Basquiat in August 1988 and the AIDS epidemic were catalysts for Mallouk to leave the East Village. She went on to receive a bachelor's degree in psychology and chemistry from Hunter College in New York. In 2001, she graduated from St. George's University School of Medicine in Grenada, British West Indies. She completed her internship in internal medicine and residency in general psychiatry at Beth Israel Medical Center. She is a diplomat of the American Board of Psychiatry and Neurology and she became a member of the American Psychoanalytic Association, after completing psychoanalytic training at the William Alanson White Institute in New York City. Mallouk continues to paint, and has a private practice in New York City as a psychiatrist and psychoanalyst.

Claire Forlani as Gina Cardinale in the Julian Schnabel film Basquiat (1996) is a composite of Basquiat's girlfriends, including Mallouk.

Widow Basquiat
In 2000, Mallouk's close friend Jennifer Clement published Widow Basquiat: A Memoir, a poetic memoir about Mallouk's relationship with Basquiat—told from Mallouk's perspective. The book was "inspired by" Mallouk's own writings and stories. "Widow Basquiat" was a nickname Rene Ricard gave to Mallouk years before Basquiat's death. The first American edition was released as Widow Basquiat: A Love Story in 2014.

Discography 

 1987: Ruby Desire – "Bad Girls" (Interior Music IM002)
 1989: Madagascar – "Like This Like That" from the compilation Black Havana (Capitol CDP 7 90923 2) (credited as Desire)

Filmography 

 1984: Who Killed Michael Stewart?
 2010: Jean-Michel Basquiat: The Radiant Child 
2010: Basquiat, Une Vie 
 2011: Gray: Live at the New Museum 
 2017: Basquiat: Rage to Riches

References

External links 

 
 

1960 births
Living people
People from Orangeville, Ontario
Canadian people of Palestinian descent
Canadian people of English descent
Hunter College alumni
American psychotherapists
Canadian emigrants to the United States
Muses
People from the East Village, Manhattan
Albert Einstein College of Medicine faculty
20th-century Canadian women singers
Capitol Records artists
Canadian women painters
20th-century Canadian women artists
American women psychiatrists
American psychiatrists
American women academics
21st-century American women